Victoria Peak is a mountain with a summit elevation of  located in the Sierra Nevada mountain range, in Mono County of northern California, United States. The summit is set in Hoover Wilderness on land managed by Humboldt–Toiyabe National Forest. The peak is situated approximately three miles west-northwest of Twin Lakes, three miles north of Kettle Peak, 1.3 mile northeast of Hunewill Peak, and one mile southwest of line parent Eagle Peak. Precipitation runoff from this mountain drains into tributaries of Robinson and Buckeye Creeks, which are within the Walker River drainage basin. The first ascent of the summit was made September 8, 1946, by A. J. Reyman.

Climate
According to the Köppen climate classification system, Victoria Peak is located in an alpine climate zone. Most weather fronts originate in the Pacific Ocean, and travel east toward the Sierra Nevada mountains. As fronts approach, they are forced upward by the peaks, causing moisture in the form of rain or snowfall to drop onto the range (orographic lift).

See also
 
 Robinson Peak
 List of mountain peaks of California

Gallery

References

External links
 Weather forecast: Victoria Peak

Mountains of Mono County, California
North American 3000 m summits
Mountains of Northern California
Sierra Nevada (United States)
Humboldt–Toiyabe National Forest